The 1883 Scottish Cup Final was the 10th final of the Scottish Cup and the final of the 1882–83 Scottish Cup, the most prestigious knockout football competition in Scotland. The original match - which ended in a 2–2 draw - was played at Hampden Park in Crosshill (today part of Glasgow) on 31 March 1883 and was watched by a crowd of 15,000 spectators. For the first time in the competition's history, the final was contested by two teams from outside Glasgow - Dumbarton, who had never won the cup before, and three-time winners Vale of Leven.

The replay took place at the same venue on 7 April 1883 in front of 8,000 spectators. Dumbarton won the competition for the first - and so far only - time after they beat Vale of Leven 2–1.

This was the last Scottish Cup final to be held at the first Hampden Park before it was demolished by the Caledonian Railway to make way for the Cathcart District Railway.

Background
Vale of Leven had reached the final on three previous occasions, winning the trophy for three consecutive seasons between 1877 and 1879. Only Queen's Park (six) had played in more finals than Vale of Leven before 1883.

Dumbarton became the third different team to reach the final on three consecutive occasions after Queen's Park and Vale of Leven. Both their previous appearances in the final had ended in defeat after a replay to Queen's Park in 1881 and 1882.

As the earlier rounds of the Scottish Cup were regionalised at the time, Dunbartonshire clubs Dumbarton and Vale of Leven had previously met five times in the competition. Vale of Leven had gone on to win the Scottish Cup after their first two meetings in 1877–78 and 1878–79 but Dumbarton had won each of the subsequent three ties.

Route to the final

Dumbarton

Vale of Leven

Notes

Match details

Original

Replay

External links
London Hearts Scottish Football Reports 31 March 1883
London Hearts Scottish Football Reports 7 April 1883
Dumbarton 2–2 Vale of Leven, Saturday, March 31st, 1883, (The Dumbarton Archive)
Vale of Leven 1–2 Dumbarton, Saturday, April 7th, 1883, (The Dumbarton Archive)

References

Scottish Cup Finals
Scottish Cup Final 1883
Scottish Cup Final 1883
Cup
19th century in Glasgow
March 1883 sports events
April 1883 sports events